Una is an unincorporated community in Spartanburg County, South Carolina, United States. Una has a post office with ZIP code 29378, which opened on November 14, 1928.

References

Unincorporated communities in Spartanburg County, South Carolina
Unincorporated communities in South Carolina